Mechanics Engine House No. 4, also known as Fire Engine Company House No. 4, at 950 Third St. in Macon, Georgia was built around 1870.  It was listed on the National Register of Historic Places in 1990.

It was used by volunteer firefighters from c.1870 to 1890, then by professionals until 1930.

References

National Register of Historic Places in Bibb County, Georgia
Italianate architecture in Georgia (U.S. state)
Government buildings completed in 1870
Fire stations on the National Register of Historic Places in Georgia (U.S. state)